The PFL 4 mixed martial arts event for the 2018 season of the Professional Fighters League was held on July 19, 2018, at the Nassau Coliseum in Uniondale, New York. This was the fourth regular season event of 2018 and included fights in the featherweight and heavyweight divisions.

Background

Originally fights were set between Bekbulat Magomedov vs. Magomed Idrisov and Timur Valiev vs. Lee Coville, however Idrisov and Coville were forced to pull out for undisclosed reasons. At first Carl Deaton and Darrick Minner were scheduled as replacements, but on weigh in day both missed the 146-pound limit, and as a result PFL elected to pull them off the card, and instead pair up their intended opponents to create Bekbulat Magomedov vs. Timur Valiev.

Results

Standings After Event
The point system consists of outcome based scoring and bonuses for an early win. Under the outcome based scoring system, the winner of a fight receives 3 points and the loser receives 0 points. If the fight ends in a draw, both fighters will receive 1 point. The bonus for winning a fight in the first, second, or third round is 3 points, 2 points, and 1 point respectively. For example, if a fighter wins a fight in the first round, then the fighter will receive 6 total points. If a fighter misses weight, then the fighter that missed weight will receive 0 points and his opponent will receive 3 points due to a walkover victory.

Featherweight

Heavyweight

♛ = Clinched playoff spot ---
E = Eliminated

See also
List of PFL events
List of current PFL fighters

References

Professional Fighters League
2018 in mixed martial arts
Mixed martial arts in New York (state)
Sports in Long Island
2018 in sports in New York (state)
July 2018 sports events in the United States
Events on Long Island
Events in Uniondale, New York